Kowalewko  is a village in the administrative district of Gmina Kcynia, within Nakło County, Kuyavian-Pomeranian Voivodeship, in north-central Poland.

Kowalewko is the birthplace of Mieczysław Rakowski, the last First Secretary of the Polish United Workers' Party and former Prime Minister of Poland from 1988 to 1989.

References

Kowalewko